is a Japanese football player. He plays for Honda Lock.

Club statistics

References

External links

1985 births
Living people
Association football people from Miyazaki Prefecture
Japanese footballers
J2 League players
Japan Football League players
Hokkaido Consadole Sapporo players
Zweigen Kanazawa players
Honda Lock SC players
Association football defenders